Brian Babit (born 21 March 1993) is a French professional footballer who plays as a midfielder for Swift Hesperange.

Club career

Babit made his professional debut in November 2012 in a 2–1 victory against Nîmes.

After Dijon, ASM Belfort, Sarreguemines and Virton, he moved to Swift Hesperange in December 2018.

References

External links

Brian Babit foot-national.com Profile

1993 births
Living people
Association football midfielders
French footballers
Ligue 2 players
Championnat National players
Dijon FCO players
Amiens SC players
ASM Belfort players
R.E. Virton players
People from Saint-Avold
Footballers from Grand Est
Sportspeople from Moselle (department)
French expatriate sportspeople in Belgium
French expatriate footballers
Expatriate footballers in Belgium
Expatriate footballers in Luxembourg
French expatriate sportspeople in Luxembourg
FC Swift Hesperange players